In chemistry, a hydrogen atom abstraction or hydrogen atom transfer (HAT) is any chemical reaction in which a hydrogen free radical (neutral hydrogen atom) is abstracted from a substrate according to the general equation:

X^\bullet{} + H-Y -> X-H{} + Y^\bullet

Examples of HAT reactions are oxidative reactions in general, hydrocarbon combustion, and reactions involving cytochrome P450 containing an iron(V)-oxo unit. The abstractor (X•) is usually a radical species itself, but it may also be a closed-shell species such as chromyl chloride. HAT can take place through proton-coupled electron transfer. A synthetic example is found in iron zeolites, which stabilize alpha-oxygen.

References

Chemical reactions
Reaction mechanisms